Maniacal is the third full-length studio album by the New York City crossover thrash band, Sworn Enemy. The album was released in the United States in 2007.

Track listing
 "Ignorance" – 2:43
 "Time to Rage" – 2:21
 "A Place of Solace" – 4:14
 "Weather the Storm" – 3:41
 "Destroyer" – 2:58
 "The American Way" – 3:17
 "Fear of Failure" – 3:19
 "No End to This Nightmare" - 3:18
 "Talk Is Cheap" – 2:59
 "Said and Done" – 5:24

Credits
 Sal Lococo - vocals
 Lorenzo Antonucci - guitar
 Jamin Hunt - guitar
 Sid Awesome - bass guitar
 Jordan Mancino - drums

Sworn Enemy albums
2008 albums
Century Media Records albums